Tuxpam may refer to
Túxpam de Rodríguez Cano, a city in Mexico
SS Tuxpam (1915) or SS Flying Lark, a banana boat built in 1915
SS Tuxpam (1944), a dredger built in 1944